Oxygraphis is a genus of flowering plants belonging to the family Ranunculaceae.

Its native range is Europe, Tropical Asia, Northern America and Temperate Asia.

Species:
 Oxygraphis chrysocycla Rech.f. 
 Oxygraphis delavayi Franch.

References

Ranunculaceae
Ranunculaceae genera
Taxa named by Alexander von Bunge